Chaklasi is a city and a municipality in Kheda district  in the state of Gujarat, India.

Geography
It has an average elevation of 34 metres (111 feet).

Demographics
 India census, Chaklasi had a population of 36,041. Males constitute 52% of the population and females 48%. Chaklasi has an average literacy rate of 66%, higher than the national average of 59.5%; with male literacy of 77% and female literacy of 53%. 14% of the population is under 6 years of age.

References

Cities and towns in Kheda district